The ALBA Games (Spanish: Juegos Deportivos del ALBA) are a multi-sport event organized by the Bolivarian Alliance for the Americas (ALBA). The games are held once every two years. It was originally intended only for athletes of the ALBA member states but it has expanded to other countries in the Americas.

The first edition was held in 2005 in Havana, Cuba. Since then it was decided that Cuba and Venezuela will be switching editions every two years. However, there is a possibility that other countries may host the games in future editions.

Amid the international isolation Russia is facing due to the invasion of Ukraine, ALBA invited Russia to participate at the 2023 Games.

Games

All time medal table 
As of 2011 - note that records for the 2005 Games are incomplete.

See also
 Athletics at the ALBA Games
 Pan American Games
 South American Games

References

External links
 ALBA Sports Games

 
Multi-sport events in North America
Multi-sport events in South America
Recurring sporting events established in 2005